{{Infobox award
| name          = Independent Spirit Award for Best Supporting Male
| awarded_for   =
| presenter     = Film Independent
| year          = Morgan Freeman – Street Smart (1988)
| year2         = Troy Kotsur – CODA (2021)
| website       = 
}}
The Independent Spirit Award for Best Supporting Male was one of the annual Independent Spirit Awards. It was first presented in 1987, with Morgan Freeman being the first recipient, for his role as Fast Black in Street Smart. It was last presented in 2022 with Troy Kotsur being the final recipient of the award for his role in CODA''.

In 2022, it was announced that the four acting categories would be retired and replaced with two gender neutral categories, with both Best Supporting Male and Best Supporting Female merging into the Best Supporting Performance category. 

Alan Arkin, Christopher Plummer, Jared Leto, J. K. Simmons, Sam Rockwell and Troy Kotsur are the only actors to have won both this award and the Academy Award for Best Supporting Actor the same year.

Steve Buscemi, Willem Dafoe and Benicio del Toro are the only actors who have received this award more than once, with two wins each.

Winners and nominees

1980s

1990s

2000s

2010s

2020s

Multiple nominees

2 nominations
 Alan Arkin
 Kevin Corrigan
 Paul Dano
 Colman Domingo
 Benicio del Toro
 Charles S. Dutton
 John Hawkes
 Samuel L. Jackson
 Richard Jenkins
 Shia LaBeouf
 Bill Murray
 Max Perlich
 Christopher Plummer
 Sam Rockwell
 Peter Sarsgaard
 Steve Zahn

3 nominations
 Steve Buscemi
 Willem Dafoe
 Gary Farmer
 John C. Reilly 
 David Strathairn

Multiple winners
2 wins
 Steve Buscemi
 Willem Dafoe
 Benicio del Toro (consecutive)

See also
 Academy Award for Best Supporting Actor
 BAFTA Award for Best Actor in a Supporting Role
 Critics' Choice Movie Award for Best Supporting Actor
 Golden Globe Award for Best Supporting Actor – Motion Picture
 Screen Actors Guild Award for Outstanding Performance by a Male Actor in a Supporting Role

References

External links
Every BEST SUPPORTING MALE winner ever video on the official Film Independent YouTube channel

Male, Supp
 
Film awards for supporting actor